Simen Alexander Santos Lyngbø (born 18 February 1998) is a professional footballer who plays as a full-back for Philippines Football League club United City. Born in Norway, he plays for the Philippines national team.

Club career

Youth
Born in Baerum, Norway, Lyngbø started his youth career at Stabæk Fotball and Bærum.

Bærum
In 2017, Lyngbø was promoted to the senior team of Bærum. He made his debut for Baerum in a 1-0 home win over Oppsal in the Norwegian Football Cup.

Azkals Development Team
Before the 2020 season, Lyngbø signed for Philippines Football League club Azkals Development Team. Lyngbø made his Philippines Football League debut in a 1-0 defeat against defending champions United City.

Ready
In 2021, he left the Azkals Development Team and joined 3. divisjon club Ready.

United City
Lyngbø returned to the Philippines in March 2022 and signed for United City, seeking a chance to play in the AFC Champions League.

International career
Born in Norway to a Norwegian father and a Filipino mother, Lyngbø is eligible to represent Norway or the Philippines at international level.

Philippines
In 2019, Lyngbø received his first call up for the Philippines national team in a training camp in Bangkok, Thailand.

In December 2022, he made his debut for the Philippines  in a 1–0 friendly defeat against Vietnam.

References

External links
 
 

Living people
Sportspeople from Bærum
Filipino footballers
Philippines international footballers
Norwegian footballers
Filipino people of Norwegian descent
Norwegian people of Filipino descent
Expatriate footballers in the Philippines
Citizens of the Philippines through descent
Association football defenders
1998 births
Norwegian First Division players
Bærum SK players
Azkals Development Team players